Maybin Chisanga (born 4 March 1971) is a Zambian footballer. He played in six matches for the Zambia national football team in 1998 and 1999. He was also named in Zambia's squad for the 1998 African Cup of Nations tournament.

References

External links
 
 

1971 births
Living people
Zambian footballers
Zambia international footballers
1998 African Cup of Nations players
Place of birth missing (living people)
Association football midfielders
Kabwe Warriors F.C. players
Power Dynamos F.C. players